Ratanlal Bhagatram Choudary is an Indian film producer who has worked in several film industries, predominantly in Tamil and Telugu along with a few films in Malayalam and Hindi. He is the founder of the production company Super Good Films.

Career
R. B. Choudary hails from a Rajasthani family. He worked in the steel, exports and jewel industries before entering film production. He started his career as a producer with Malayalam film industry first and produced a few films under "Super" banner. In 1989, he entered Tamil film industry and produced films on 'Super' banner in partnership with R. Mohan, who manufactured "Good Knight" mosquito mats. When they decided to part ways, Choudary borrowed good from 'Good Knight' and modified it as 'Super Good' films.

Personal life
Choudhary married Mahjabeen, a Tamilian woman. Choudary's sons Jiiva and Jithan Ramesh are both actors.

Filmography

Awards
A list of awards received by R. B. Choudary include:
Filmfare Awards
1990 - Filmfare Award for Best Film – Tamil - Pudhu Vasantham
1999 - Filmfare Award for Best Film – Telugu - Raja
2001 - Filmfare Award for Best Film – Tamil - Aanandham

Tamil Nadu State Film Awards
1990 - Tamil Nadu State Film Award for Best Film (1st) - Pudhu Vasantham
1991 - Tamil Nadu State Film Award Special Prize - Cheran Pandiyan
1993 - Tamil Nadu State Film Award for Best Film (3rd) - Gokulam
1994 - Tamil Nadu State Film Award for Best Film (1st) - Naatamai
1997 - Tamil Nadu State Film Award for Best Film (1st) - Suryavamsam
1999 - Tamil Nadu State Film Award for Best Film (2nd) - Thulladha Manamum Thullum 
2001 - Tamil Nadu State Film Award for Best Film (3rd) - Aanandham

Cinema Express Awards
1994 - Cinema Express Award for Best Film – Tamil - Naatamai
1997 - Cinema Express Award for Best Film – Tamil - Suryavamsam
1998 - Cinema Express Award for Best Film – Tamil - Unnidathil Ennai Koduthen
2001 - Cinema Express Award for Best Film – Tamil - Aanandham

References

External links 
 

Living people
Film producers from Chennai
Tamil film producers
Telugu film producers
Malayalam film producers
Date of birth missing (living people)
Hindi film producers
Year of birth missing (living people)